Jan Marc Riegler (born 18 April 1988) is an Austrian footballer.

References

External links
 

1988 births
Living people
Austrian footballers
Austrian Football Bundesliga players
SV Ried players
Association football defenders
People from Braunau am Inn
Footballers from Upper Austria